Zunun Kadir (Uyghur: زۇنۇن قادىرى) was a modern Uyghur poet, playwright and novelist who was born in Emin, Xinjiang in 1911. Kadir began his career in 1936, and published his three-acts drama Wen-chʻing-mu in 1942. He died in Almaty on September 24, 1989.

References 
Zunun Qadir&Muhămmăt Polat, Zunun Qadir ăsărliri. Ürümchi: Shinjiang khălq năshriyati, 1992. .
S. Frederick Starr (seditor), Xinjiang: China's Muslim borderland. New York: M.E. Sharpe Inc, 2004. .

Further reading

1911 births
1989 deaths
Uyghur poets
Uyghur writers
20th-century poets
Chinese poets
Chinese emigrants to the Soviet Union